The Russian geoglyph refers to a geoglyph on slopes of the Zyuratkul Mountains in the Chelyabinsk region in Russia.

Description and discovery

The geoglyph depicts accurate contours of an animal similar to an elk or moose, with four legs, two antlers and a long snout. It may also have had a tail, though this has now been obscured. It was first detected in 2011 by Alexander Shestakov using satellite imagery. He notified researchers who surveyed the outline using a paraglider and seaplane. Research has continued into the site under Stanislav Grigoriev from the Russian Academy of Sciences Institute of History and Archaeology. Grigoriev published an article with Nikolai Menshenin from the State Centre for Monument Protection about the discovery in the Antiquity journal in spring 2011.

Excavation

The borders consist of large stones with a center filled with smaller ones. Builders of the object cut off a soil layer down to virgin clay and placed stones into this trench.

The stones are now covered by a layer of patina with a dark shade. Earlier they were lighter and were perfectly visible from the ridge because the huge size of the drawing. Excavations in the summer of 2012 have revealed small walls and remains of what are thought to be passageways on the areas around the hoof and snout of the animal. Grigoriev remarked that "the hoof is made of small crushed stones and clay. It seems to me there were very low walls and narrow passages among them. The same situation in the area of a muzzle: crushed stones and clay, four small broad walls and three passages." The geolyph is thought to have been created by a "megalithic culture" operating in the area during the past and connected with other Megaliths in the Urals and on Vera Island.

Dating

Grigoriev has found over forty stone tools resembling pickaxes during recent excavations that Grigoriev suggests show a style of Lithic reduction dating to the Neolithic or Chalcolithic periods between 4000 and 2000 BCE. Further accuracy regarding the dating of the geoglyph is hoped to be obtained from an ongoing study using pollen core analysis. This suggested dating would place the construction of the  geoglyph many centuries before that of the Nazca lines in Peru, the Blythe geoglyphs in California and several in England, making it one of the oldest examples of land art in the world.

References

External links
 Geoglyph "Elk" on Wikimapia
 Image Gallery of the Russian Geoglyph on Live Science

Archaeological sites in Russia
Geoglyphs
Prehistoric art
Land art
Prehistoric inscriptions
Earth mysteries
Megalithic monuments in Europe
Prehistoric Russia